Cambridge High School is a state secondary school in the Waikato town of Cambridge. Cambridge High School is a co-educational state secondary school, students from the town and surrounding rural areas attend the school. The school is a large part of the Cambridge community, participating in a wide network of formal and informal relationships with other agencies and groups.

Notable alumni

 Brian Coote – legal academic
 Nikita Howarth – Paralympian
 Dick Myers – rugby union player
 Jake Bezzant - Businessman / Politician 
 Luke Jacobson - All Black

References

Secondary schools in Waikato